Heimatærde is a German electro-industrial band with a medieval motif. It was created as a studio project by Disc jockey Ashlar von Megalon (DJ Ash) in 2004.

History 
Heimatærde was founded in 2004, as a studio project by German DJ Ashlar von Megalon. After the first EP Ich hab die Nacht getræumet (tr. I Have Dreamed the Night), released in the same year by Infacted Recordings, the first album 'Gotteskrieger' was released in 2005. Outside Germany it is released from Metropolis Records. In the beginning, DJ Ash avoided acting on stage, because music should be in the fore.
The first performance of Heimatærde was 2007 at Wave-Gotik-Treffen in Leipzig. In January 2018, the new drummer, Brother Henry of Kent, was introduced. He has supported the band live before.

Heimataerde's Concert History 
"Envisioned by DJ Ash, Heimataerde merges electronic dancefloor beats and soft, often archaically instrumented melodies. A recent addition to the music world, the band released an EP in 2004, Ich Hab Die Nacht Getraeumet, which contained five tracks, including two versions of the title track."

Discography

Albums

 Gotteskrieger (2005)
 Kadavergehorsam (2006)
 Unwesen (2007)
 Gottgleich (2012)
 Kaltwærts (2014)
 Ærdenbrand (2016)
 Eigengrab (2020)

Singles
 Ich Hab Die Nacht Geträumet (2004)
 Unter der Linden (2006)
 Vater (2008)
 Dark Dance (2009)
 Malitia Angelica (2010)
 Bruderschaft (2014)
 Hick Hack Hackebeil (2016)

Gallery

External links

 Official site

Sources

Electro-industrial music groups
German electronic music groups
Musical groups established in 2004
Metropolis Records artists
2004 establishments in Germany